Elizabeth Bell (December 1, 1928 – December 19, 2016) was an American composer.

Life and education
Elizabeth Bell was born in Cincinnati in 1928. She gained her Bachelor of Arts in music from Wellesley College in 1950, and  a BS in composition from Juilliard in 1953. She studied under Peter Mennin and Vittorio Giannini. Later she also studied with Paul Alan Levi. From 1969 to 1975 Bell worked as the music critic of the Ithaca Journal. Her music has been performed  throughout the world. She was a founding member of New York Women Composers, Inc. and served on the Board of Governors of American Composers Alliance. She was also strongly involved with the International Alliance of Women in Music. Bell died on December 19, 2016 in Tarrytown, New York.

Family

She married astronomer Frank Drake in 1953 and they had three sons. In 1983 she married Robert E. Friou.

Awards and commissions

 1986 First prize for Perne in a Gyre
 1996 Grand prize for Spectra, Utah composers competition
 1994 Delius prize for Duovarios, Jacksonville, Florida

Bell has had numerous commissions including
 The New York State Council on the Arts
 The Bradshaw/Buono duo
 The Inoue Chamber Ensemble
 The North/South Consonance
 The Putnam Valley Orchestra
 The Vienna Modern Masters
 Max Lifchitz
Of an Eleanor Elkins recital Bell said:

"My piece, Night music, was something of a revelation. Max Lifchitz (who commissioned it) has played it numerous times, and recorded it on the Vienna Modern Masters label. His interpretation is brilliant and satisfying. Eleanor's was entirely different: also brilliant, but more sombre and angry, more suggestive of 'night music.' I like them both, and am delighted to have Ms. Elkins' interpretation on tape."

Works

 Andromeda (1993) 
 Arecibo Sonata (1968)
 Concertino For Chamber Orchestra (2015)
 Concerto For Orchestra (1976)
 Duovarios (1987)
 Fantasy-Sonata (1971)
 Kaleidoscope – (1969)
 Les Neiges D'antan – Sonata For Violin And Piano (1998)
 Loss Songs (1983)
 Millennium (1988)
 Night Music (1990)
 Perne In A Gyre (1984)
 Rituals For Orchestra (1988)
 River Fantasy (1991)
 Second Sonata (1972)
 Six Loss-Songs (1983)
 Soliloquy For Solo Cello (1980)
 Soliloquy For Solo Violin (1980)
 Songs Of Here And Forever (1970) 
 Spectra (1989) 
 String Quartet #1 (1957) 
 Summer Suite (1982) 
 Symphony No. 1 (1971) 
 Variations & Interludes (1952)

References

1928 births
2016 deaths
American women classical composers
American classical composers
20th-century classical composers
Musicians from Cincinnati
Wellesley College alumni
Juilliard School alumni
20th-century American women musicians
20th-century American musicians
20th-century American composers
Classical musicians from Ohio
20th-century women composers
21st-century American women